The Hierophant is the fourth studio album by the noise metal band Will Haven. It was released on June 19, 2007 on Bieler Bros. The album release was six years after Carpe Diem, their previous full-length. Vocalist Grady Avenell contributed to the writing of the album on several songs, but not to the recording process. Instead, he was replaced by Jeff Jaworski.

Track listing
All songs written by Will Haven.
 "Grey Sky at Night" – 1:16
 "King's Cross" – 4:37 (Jaworski)
 "Helena" – 2:34 (Jaworski)
 "Hierophant" – 3:41 (Jaworski/Avenell)
 "Caviar with Maths" – 4:07 (Jaworski)
 "Landing on Ice" – 5:31 (Jaworski)
 "Skinner" – 4:50 (Jaworski)
 "Handlebars to Freedom" – 3:53 (Jaworski/Avenell)
 "A Day Without Speaking" – 4:28 (Jaworski)
 "Singing in Solitary" – 3:35 (Jaworski/Avenell)
 "Sammy Davis Jr.'s One Good Eye" – 3:35 (Jaworski/Avenell)
 "Firedealer" – 5:05 (Jaworski)
 "Dark Sun Sets" – 4:42

Personnel

Band members

 Jeff Irwin – guitar
 Jeff Jaworski – vocals
 Mike Martin – bass guitar
 Mitch Wheeler – drums and additional vocals

Other personnel

Grady Avenell – songwriting
Mike Fuller – mixing
Lance Jackman – additional vocals
Shaun Lopez – production and additional vocals
Chino Moreno – production
Gerri Robinson – art coordinator
Magnus Sandberg – photography
Antony Sarti – programming and samples
Jared Shaltes – photography and design
Alice Verlant-Jacq – additional vocals

References

External links
 Track By Track by Jeff Irwin

Will Haven albums
2007 albums
Bieler Bros. Records albums